Crisilla gagliniae is a species of minute sea snail, a marine gastropod mollusk or micromollusk in the family Rissoidae.

Description

Distribution

References

 Alvania gagliniae sp. n. (Gastropoda, Prosobranchia). Notiziario del C.I.S.MA. 6(1-2): 35-41

External links
 Appolloni, M.; Smriglio, C.; Amati, B.; Lugliè, L.; Nofroni, I.; Tringali, L. P.; Mariottini, P.; Oliverio, M. (2018). Catalogue of the primary types of marine molluscan taxa described by Tommaso Allery Di Maria, Marquis of Monterosato, deposited in the Museo Civico di Zoologia, Roma. Zootaxa. 4477(1): 1-138

Rissoidae
Gastropods described in 1985